Sinaugoro is an Austronesian language of Papua New Guinea. It is mainly spoken in the Rigo District of Central Province by some 15,000 people. The language is closely related to Motu.

Writing system

Grammar
Sinaugoro is an agglutinative language with ergative alignment and subject–object–verb (SOV) word order.
Number is marked explicitly on the verb and freely within the noun phrase, but is not marked on the noun itself.  
A morphological distinction is made in Sinaugoro between the possession of alienable and inalienable nouns, and then between the alienable possession of edible and inedible objects.

Verbal indexing of person and number in Sinaugoro makes freestanding personal pronouns optional. These are given below, displaying a distinction between inclusive and exclusive.

Notes

References

External links 
 Sinaugoro phonology
 Sinaugoro dictionary
 Paradisec has multiple links to Sinaugoro language materials.

Central Papuan Tip languages
Languages of Central Province (Papua New Guinea)